The Missoula PaddleHeads are an independent baseball team of the Pioneer League, which is not affiliated with Major League Baseball (MLB) but is an MLB Partner League. They are located in Missoula, Montana, and play their home games at Ogren Park at Allegiance Field.

In conjunction with a contraction of Minor League Baseball in 2021, the Pioneer League, of which the PaddleHeads have been members since 1999, was converted from an MLB-affiliated Rookie Advanced league to an independent baseball league and granted status as an MLB Partner League, with Missoula continuing as members. Prior to this, the PaddleHeads had been affiliated with the Arizona Diamondbacks (1996–2020).

The team has won the Pioneer League championship five times; in 1999, 2006, 2012, 2015, and 2021.

The club was known as the Missoula Osprey from 1999 through the 2019 season. Previously, the franchise played in Lethbridge, Alberta, as the Lethbridge Black Diamonds. Missoula has had baseball since the early 1900s, with previous team names being the Highlanders and the Timberjacks. 

In 2019, the team rebranded as the Missoula PaddleHeads, a term referencing moose antlers being known as "paddles", making the male moose a "paddlehead". The brand also showcases the diversity of kayaking, canoeing and other river-based activities found in Missoula, while the logo features a baseball bat paddle and a partially submerged moose.

Missoula alumni with MLB experience 
Sixty-nine Missoula players have also played in Major League Baseball. They are:
1999 JD Closser, Jorge de la Rosa, Doug DeVore, Lyle Overbay, Duaner Sánchez, Luis Terrero (1999-2000)
2000 Casey Daigle, Jerry Gil, Andy Green, Phil Stockman,  José Valverde
2001 Scott Hairston
2002 Dustin Nippert, Tony Peña, Sergio Santos, Miguel Montero (2002-2003)
2003 Emilio Bonifacio, Carlos González,
2004 Wilkin Castillo, Steven Jackson, Esmerling Vásquez
2005 Pedro Ciriaco, Rusty Ryal, Greg Smith
2006 Héctor Ambriz, John Hester, Jordan Norberto, Gerardo Parra, Daniel Stange, Clay Zavada, Tony Barnette 
2007 Bryan Augenstein, Tommy Layne, Evan Scribner, Jarrod Parker, Rey Navarro (2007-2008) 
2008 Jake Elmore, Daniel Schlereth, Bryan Shaw 
2009 Chase Anderson, Mike Belfiore, Charles Brewer, Keon Broxton, Eury De La Rosa, Paul Goldschmidt, Bradin Hagens, Ender Inciarte, Chris Owings, Patrick Schuster (2009-2010), Enrique Burgos (2009, 2011) 
2010 Adam Eaton, David Holmberg, Stephen Cardullo (2010-2011)
2011 Archie Bradley, Keith Hessler, DJ Johnson
2012 Socrates Brito, Jake Lamb, Michael Perez, Andrew Velazquez
2013 Silvino Bracho, Steve Hathaway, Brad Keller (2013-2014), Justin Williams (2013-2014), Daniel Palka
2014 Gabriel Moya (2014-2015), Yefry Ramirez (2014-2015), Touki Toussaint

Roster

References

External links
Official website

Baseball teams established in 1987
Pioneer League (baseball) teams
Arizona Diamondbacks minor league affiliates
Professional baseball teams in Montana
San Francisco Giants minor league affiliates
Sports in Missoula, Montana
1987 establishments in Montana